Blaine Lake is a town in central Saskatchewan, Canada. It is located 85 km north of Saskatoon, 104 km southwest of Prince Albert and 104 km east of North Battleford at the junction of Highway 12 and Highway 40. Nearby are the urban centres of Shellbrook and Rosthern.
Blaine Lake is considered the "Gateway to the Northern Lakes" due to its proximity to fishing, hunting and camping sites, as well as its convenient location at a junction of two highways.

History

A surveyor named Blaine was drowned in the lake prior to the establishment in 1911.

The historic CN train station that now houses the Blaine Lake Wapiti Library along with the local town history museum. The station was built in 1912 two years after the rail line between Prince Albert and North Battleford was constructed and served the community until 1973. The Doukhobor Dugout House is a Provincial Heritage Property southeast of the town.

Heritage properties
A number of heritage buildings are located within the community: St. Andrew's Roman Catholic Church built in 1914,  the Doukhobor Prayer Home built in 1931  and the CN Station Building built in 1912.

Demographics 

Amenities
Blaine Lake is known for being "The Gateway to the Lakes!" as many lakes, campgrounds, golf courses and tourist attractions are located within a short distance from the town.

The community has a curling rink, a skating rink, grocery store, hardware store, post office, several restaurants and two gas stations.  Other businesses include a SARCAN recycle depot, an insurance broker, a veterinarian, a metal fabricator, a sign shop and several construction contractors.

Education
Blaine Lake has an elementary and high school called the Blaine Lake Composite School. It has 175 students and is in the Prairie Spirit School Division # 206.

References

External links

Towns in Saskatchewan
Division No. 16, Saskatchewan